Calliostomatidae is a family of sea snails within the superfamily Trochoidea and the clade Vetigastropoda.

Description 
The Calliostomatidae are unusually diverse. They are characterized by a stepped spire and a pointy aperture. They may possess or lack an umbilicus. The collumella is sometimes thicker, partially covering the aperture. The spiral whorls can differ between narrow and robust. They inhabit a wide range of ocean habitats, from the intertidal zone to mid-bathyal depths.

Taxonomy 
This taxon was long considered to be a subfamily of the Trochidae.

2005 taxonomy 
This family consists of two following subfamilies (according to the taxonomy of the Gastropoda by Bouchet & Rocroi, 2005):

 subfamily Calliostomatinae Thiele 1924 (1847)
 tribe Calliostomatini Thiele 1924 (1847) - synonym: Ziziphininae Gray, 1847
 tribe Fautricini Marshall, 1995
 subfamily Thysanodontinae Marshall, 1988

2008 taxonomy 
According to Williams et al. (2008) the Calliostomatidae stays in Trochoidea. Up to 2008 there were only two species Calliostoma javanicum and Calliostoma unicum that were used in molecular phylogeny studies.

2010 taxonomy 
The first molecular phylogeny study of the family Calliostomatidae was made by Williams et al. (2010)  Based on molecular data, they confirmed that Thysanodontinae  Marshall, 1988  belongs to the family Calliostomatidae,. It was already previously placed there based on morphological data.

2016 taxonomy
The tribe Fautricini B. A. Marshall, 1995 was raised to the rank of subfamily Fautricinae B. A. Marshall, 1995

Genera 
Genera included in this family:

Calliostomatinae
 Akoya Habe, 1961
 Alertalex Dell, 1956
 Astele Swainson, 1855
 Astelena Iredale, 1924
 Bathyfautor Marshall, 1995
 Calliostoma Swainson, 1840 - type genus
 Carinator Ikebe, 1942
 Dactylastele Marshall, 1995
 Dymares Schwengel, 1942
 Eucasta Dall, 1889
 Fluxina Dall, 1881
 Laetifautor Iredale, 1929
 Maurea Oliver, 1926
 Neocalliostoma Castellanos & Fernandez, 1976
 Otukaia Ikebe, 1942
 Photinastoma Powell, 1951
 Photinula Adams, 1854
 Sinutor Cotton & Godfrey, 1935
 Tropidotrochus Parodiz, 1977
 † Venustas Allan, 1926
 Venustatrochus Powell, 1951
 Ziziphinus Gray, 1842
Fautricinae B. A. Marshall, 1995
 Falsimargarita Powell, 1951
 Fautrix Marshall, 1995 
 Phenacomargarites B. A. Marshall, 2016 
 Selastele Marshall, 1995
 Margarellinae Williams, 2013
 Margarella Thiele, 1893
Thysanodontinae B. A. Marshall, 1988
 Bruceina Özdikmen, 2013
 Carinastele Marshall, 1988
 Thysanodonta Marshall, 1988
Xeniostomatinae J. H. McLean, 2012
 Xeniostoma McLean, 2012

Invalid genus names
 Ampullotrochus Monterosato, 1890: reduced in rank to Calliostoma (Ampullotrochus) Monterosato, 1890 within Calliostoma Swainson, 1840
 Benthastelena Iredale, 1936: synonym of Calliostoma Swainson, 1840
 Calliotropis Oliver, 1926: synonym of Calliostoma (Maurea) Oliver, 1926 within Calliostoma Swainson, 1840
 Callistele Cotton & Godfrey, 1935: synonym of Astele Swainson, 1855
 Callistoma Herrmannsen, 1846: misspelling of Calliostoma Swainson, 1840
 Callistomus Herrmannsen, 1846: misspelling of Calliostoma Swainson, 1840
 Calotropis Thiele, 1929: misspelling of Calliotropis Oliver, 1926
 Conulus Nardo, 1841: synonym of Calliostoma Swainson, 1840
 Coralastele Iredale, 1930: synonym of Astele Swainson, 1855
 Elmerlinia Clench & Turner, 1960: synonym of Calliostoma Swainson, 1840
 Eutrochus A. Adams, 1864: synonym of Astele Swainson, 1855
 Fautor Iredale, 1924: reduced in rank to Calliostoma (Fautor) Iredale, 1924 within Calliostoma Swainson, 1840
 Herbertina Marshall, 1988: synonym of Bruceina Özdikmen, 2013
 Jacinthinus Monterosato, 1889: synonym of Calliostoma Swainson, 1840
 Kingotrochus Ihering, 1902: synonym of Photinula H. Adams & A. Adams, 1854
 Kombologion Clench & Turner, 1960: synonym of Calliostoma Swainson, 1840
 Leiotrochus Conrad, 1862: synonym of Calliostoma Swainson, 1840
 Margaritella Thiele, 1891: junior homonym, replaced by Margarella Thiele, 1893
 Mauriella Oliver, 1926: synonym of Calliostoma (Maurea) Oliver, 1926 within Calliostoma Swainson, 1840
 Mucrinops Finlay, 1926: synonym of Calliostoma (Maurea) Oliver, 1926 within Calliostoma Swainson, 1840
 Omphalotukaia Yoshida, 1948: synonym of Calliostoma Swainson, 1840
 Photina H. Adams & A. Adams, 1853: junior homonym, replaced by Photinula H. Adams & A. Adams, 1854
 Salsipotens Iredale, 1924: synonym of Astele Swainson, 1855
 Spicator Cotton & Godfrey, 1935: synonym of Laetifautor Iredale, 1929
 Tristichotrochus Ikebe, 1942: synonym of Calliostoma (Benthastelena) Iredale, 1936 within Calliostoma Swainson, 1840
 Venustas Finlay, 1927: synonym of Calliostoma (Maurea) Oliver, 1926 within Calliostoma Swainson, 1840
 Zizyphinus Gray, 1847: misspelling of Ziziphinus Gray, 1842

References

External links 

 
Trochoidea (superfamily)
Taxa named by Johannes Thiele (zoologist)